Brada-Rybníček is a municipality in Jičín District in the Hradec Králové Region of the Czech Republic. It has about 200 inhabitants.

Administrative parts
The municipality is made up of villages of Brada and Rybníček.

References

Villages in Jičín District